The Paps of Lothian are two hills in Scotland:
Arthur's Seat
North Berwick Law

See also
Paps (disambiguation)